Ranban  or Ramban was a village development committee in Sarlahi District in the Janakpur Zone of south-eastern Nepal. Now After federalism it became one ward of Godaita Nagatpalika. At the time of the 1991 Nepal census it had a population of 3,320 people living in 653 individual households.

References

External links
UN map of the municipalities of Sarlahi  District

Populated places in Sarlahi District